"Haunted Houses" is the sixth episode of the first season of the American anthology crime drama television series True Detective. The episode was written by series creator Nic Pizzolatto, and directed by executive producer Cary Joji Fukunaga. It was first broadcast on HBO in the United States on February 23, 2014.

The season focuses on Louisiana State Police homicide detectives Rustin "Rust" Cohle (Matthew McConaughey) and Martin "Marty" Hart (Woody Harrelson), who investigate the murder of prostitute Dora Lange in 1995. Seventeen years later, they must revisit the investigation, along with several other unsolved crimes. In the episode, Cohle decides to investigate on his own anything involving Billy Lee Tuttle's funded schools. Meanwhile, Hart's personal life once again is in turmoil after he starts an affair with a girl he met years ago.

According to Nielsen Media Research, the episode was seen by an estimated 2.64 million household viewers and gained a 1.1 ratings share among adults aged 18–49. The episode received critical acclaim, with critics praising the character development, performances, writing, and directing.

Plot

2002
Hart (Woody Harrelson) visits the two adult boys who had sex with Audrey (Erin Moriarty) in prison. He tells the boys that he will allow them to go as long as they don't come across his daughter ever again or he will press charges for statutory rape. He beats the boys before leaving the prison.

Cohle (Matthew McConaughey) visits Terry Guidry (Louis Herthum), whose son disappeared. He reveals that his son attended Queen of Angels, a school that was part of some Tuttle-funded schools. Cohle then visits Pastor Joel Theriot (Shea Whigham), now a disillusioned alcoholic, who mentions that the schools may be related to Wellspring, part of Tuttle's ministries. Theriot claims that at the ministry, he found evidence of child molestation and brought the information to the deacon, who did nothing. He left the school soon after.   

Hart and Cohle work a case involving a woman suffering from Munchausen by proxy who killed her own children. Cohle coaxes a confession out of the woman, then suggests she kill herself. He rudely asks Hart to type the case report, they argue as Cohle leaves the station.  

Hart goes shopping and runs into Beth (Lili Simmons), a former prostitute now working at T-Mobile. After spending some time together, they have sex. A few days later, Maggie (Michelle Monaghan) discovers his affair by seeing messages from Beth. Maggie does not confront Hart about this discovery. Later, she is seen at a bar, where she flirts with a man.

Cohle visits Kelley Reider (December Ensminger), the girl who was kept in captivity at Ledoux's shed. Now in catatonic state, she barely speaks to Cohle but mentions that a "giant" with a scarred face made her watch how he tortured the other boy. Kelly then has a mental breakdown, forcing Cohle to leave. The encounter is reprimanded by the new Major, Leroy Salter. Cohle tries to bring a connection between the old cases with Tuttle's schools and Dora Lange's murder. Salter and Hart rebuff his claims and Cohle is ordered to stop investigating.

Cohle ignores the warning and questions Billy Lee Tuttle (Jay O. Sanders), who claims that the deacon was fired for embezzlement before he died in a car accident. Tuttle allows him to get access to documents belonging to Wellspring, after which the program will reopen. Salter finds out about the meeting and suspends Cohle for one month. At his apartment, he is visited by Maggie, who is saddened about Hart's infidelity. She tempts the drunk Cohle and they have sex. Maggie tells him she did it to end her marriage. A furious Cohle kicks her out of his apartment.

Maggie tells Hart about her knowledge of his affair and also confesses to having sex with Cohle. The next day, a furious Hart attacks Cohle outside their office until they are restrained by their colleagues. Cohle won't press charges and decides to quit the police.

2012
Gilbough (Michael Potts) and Papania (Tory Kittles) bring in Maggie for questioning. Despite their claim that Cohle may be involved in some suspicious activities, Maggie maintains that she viewed him as a good person and even claims she was not aware of the fight at the parking lot and that Cohle was not involved in her divorce.

In his own questioning, Hart is asked by the detectives about Tuttle's murder and how Cohle might be related. Annoyed with the accusation, he walks out of his interview. As he is driving, he notes that he is being followed by a car and stops by the road. The driver turns out to be Cohle, who wants to talk with him. Hart accepts and both drive off in their cars.

Production

Development
In January 2014, the episode's title was revealed as "Haunted Houses" and it was announced that series creator Nic Pizzolatto had written the episode while executive producer Cary Joji Fukunaga had directed it. This was Pizzolatto's sixth writing credit, and Fukunaga's sixth directing credit.

Reception

Viewers
The episode was watched by 2.64 million viewers, earning a 1.1 in the 18-49 rating demographics on the Nielson ratings scale. This means that 1.1 percent of all households with televisions watched the episode. This was a 17% increase from the previous episode, which was watched by 2.25 million viewers with a 0.9 in the 18-49 demographics.

Critical reviews
"Haunted Houses" received critical acclaim. Jim Vejvoda of IGN gave the episode an "amazing" 9 out of 10 and wrote in his verdict, "We find out why Marty Hart and Rust Cohle had such a bitter falling out in 2002, and finally meet the power player somehow involved in the cult killings, in this fairly by-the-book (but still gripping) episode of True Detective."

Erik Adams of The A.V. Club gave the episode a "B+" grade and wrote, "True Detective is the kind of show that consumes the active viewer, be they a critic who's picking up Easter eggs or just a fan who's passing the time between episodes by jokingly 'casting' season two. I felt this on a profound level while watching 'Haunted Houses', which isn't the first season's best episode, but still managed to sink its hooks in me with the placement of one conspicuous corporate trademark." Britt Hayes of Screen Crush wrote, "The final shot shows us the back of Rust's truck, with his tail light still busted out, all these years later, from where Marty hit it during their fight when Marty found out about Rust and Maggie -- it's something Rust could easily get fixed, but it just goes to show that there's some damage you can't ever let go of; it means too much."

Alan Sepinwall of HitFix wrote, "'Haunted Houses', though, demonstrates some of the pitfalls of the structure Pizzolatto's using. It's essentially an hour of filling in the blanks – specifically, what caused the end of Hart's personal and professional marriages. Between oblique references in the 2012 interviews and what we had learned about Cohle and Hart in 1995, almost everything that happened here was something we could already infer (and, in many cases, we did)." Gwilym Mumford of The Guardian wrote, "We finally learned exactly how our detective duo's relationship went south – but bigger issues came to the fore, such as: exactly what was Cohle up to in his years 'off the grid'?" Kevin Jagernauth of IndieWire gave the episode an "A" grade and wrote, "'Haunted Houses' is an evocative title for this week's episodes accurately describing the growing rot we're seeing. The house of the Lord is certainly haunted with the deaths of women and children, the police station is haunted by their own possible ties to the murders, the former marriage of Maggie and Martin still haunts them a decade later, and of course, Rust is just plain haunted by everything in his life."

Kenny Herzog of Vulture gave the episode a perfect 5 star rating out of 5 and wrote, "True Detective works as television because of how well it functions as a play, where no matter how big the name, everyone’s there to serve a part. And within that interior drama, a handful of messed-up protagonists search for meaning amid constantly circling misdirection. That could just as well be a metaphor for True Detective itself, and with two chapters remaining, the end's beginning — or the beginning's end — is unbearably near." Tony Sokol of Den of Geek gave the episode a 4.5 star rating out of 5 and wrote, "True Detective shows that Louisiana is filled with conspiracies, large and small. For Marty, Rusty and Maggie lies come easy and everybody sticks to their stories. We can only conjecture as to the lies the new detectives are telling. When the two partners meet at the roadside, those beers they’re off to grab are so they can get their stories together not watch the bar TV. Neither Cohle nor Harte could get through an episode of Dumb Blonds in Cracker Country." 

Chris O'Hara of TV Fanatic gave the episode a 4 star rating out of 5 and wrote, "Things should certainly get interesting if they do. First because they both are no longer lawmen, but also as the tail light on Rust's truck illustrated, still broken after all these years since their parking lot fight, there are still plenty of things between them to work out." Shane Ryan of Paste gave the episode a 9.8 out of 10 and wrote, "In weeks past, we've indulged ourselves in symbolism and conjecture, but it's become clear that the truth of the resolution will transcend our theories and hearken back to choices that have been postponed for years. To catch the King in Yellow, Hart and Cohle will have to be more than brilliant — they'll have to be decisive."

Notes

References

External links
 "Haunted Houses" at HBO
 

2014 American television episodes
True Detective episodes
Television episodes written by Nic Pizzolatto